Busti is a hamlet and census-designated place in the town of Busti in Chautauqua County, New York, United States. The population was 391 at the 2010 census, out of a total population in the town of 7,351.

Geography
Busti hamlet is located east of the geographic center of the town of Busti, well south of the main settlements in the town, which are along Chautauqua Lake in the north. The hamlet is centered on a five-way intersection of Busti-Sugar Grove Road (departing southwest), Mill Road (southeast), Busti-Stillwater Road (east), Forest Avenue (northeast), and Southwestern Drive (northwest).

The hamlet sits in a valley on the north side of Stillwater Creek, an east-flowing tributary of Conewango Creek, part of the Allegheny River watershed.

Demographics

References

Hamlets in New York (state)
Census-designated places in New York (state)
Census-designated places in Chautauqua County, New York
Hamlets in Chautauqua County, New York